Pegasus is the third studio album by American rapper Trippie Redd, released on October 30, 2020. The album features guest appearances from Myiah Lynnae, Yung LB, PartyNextDoor, Chris Brown, Rich the Kid, Young Thug, Future, Lil Mosey, Quavo, Busta Rhymes, Sean Kingston, Doe Boy, Lil Wayne, HoodyBaby, and Swae Lee. The deluxe version titled Neon Shark vs Pegasus made in collaboration with Travis Barker was released on February 19, 2021, featuring  Machine Gun Kelly,  blackbear, Chino Moreno, Scarlxrd, and ZillaKami.

The album debuted at number two on the US Billboard 200 chart, earning 60,000 album-equivalent units in its first week.

Background
The album was announced by Redd in March 2020 via his Instagram story with the caption reading "PEGASUS, the album. One day". Redd said that the album would take a "dreamy, nostalgic and outer space" approach this time around. Later in June 2020, Redd had announced a deluxe version for the album, and that it would be his rock project that he teased in March 2019, and gave more information about the upcoming album on an Instagram live stream. He stated that the songs on the album would be put in a specific order as his previous project A Love Letter to You 4, with love songs being first, deep in the middle, and hard songs last. He said Pegasus would "be way better" than A Love Letter to You 4, and that "it takes you from place to place as far as genre goes. The whole goal with that was... I was thinking next level".

On August 18, 2020, the full album leaked after Redd had stated that he would delay the album further if more of his music continued to leak online. According to an interview with Redd's labelmate, rapper 6ix9ine, Pegasus was pushed back for months by Redd's label who felt that a new project from Redd would not gain enough traction to be financially viable.

On February 19, 2021, the collaborative deluxe project with Travis Barker titled Neon Shark vs Pegasus was released featuring 14 new songs including the 2020 single "Dreamer" and various collaborations with singer Machine Gun Kelly.  Prior to the album's official release, the deluxe version was accidentally leaked on the streaming service Tidal, before being taken down minutes later.

Singles
The lead single, "Excitement", with Canadian singer and rapper PartyNextDoor, was released on May 15, 2020.

On September 11, 2020, the album's second single, "I Got You", featuring American rapper Busta Rhymes, was released aside the official music video.

On October 7, 2020, "Sleepy Hollow" was released as the album's third single, while the album's tracklist and release date was also revealed.

Critical reception

Pitchfork said that the album "sounds like a randomly generated playlist: tons of options, very little soul". Minnesota Daily criticized its lyrical content saying: "Lyrically, this album is nothing special. What few lyrics you are able to pick out are either generic or completely overdone".

Commercial performance
Pegasus debuted at number two on the US Billboard 200 chart, earning 60,000 album-equivalent units, (including 4,000 copies as pure album sales) in its first week. This became Trippie Redd's fifth US top-five debut on the chart, following the release of his chart-topping project, A Love Letter to You 4. The album also accumulated a total of 79.2 million on-demand streams from the album's songs that week.

Cover artwork

The cover art was revealed on October 1, 2020, on Trippie Redd's Instagram, and shows him wearing nude-colored underwear, with his arms flailed out in front of a Pegasus horse from Greek mythology. The artwork received mixed reception from fans, with Redd later deleting the picture.

Track listing

Notes
  signifies an uncredited additional producer
 "TR666" was initially released on December 26, 2017.
 All songs on the deluxe stylized in all caps.
 All songs on the deluxe are with Travis Barker, except "Dreamer".

Sample credits
 "TR666" contains a sample of "A Garden of Peace" performed by Lonnie Liston Smith.
 "I Got You" interpolates "I Know What You Want" performed by Busta Rhymes and Mariah Carey.

Charts

Weekly charts

Year-end charts

Certifications

References

2020 albums
Trippie Redd albums
Albums produced by J.U.S.T.I.C.E. League
Albums produced by Wheezy
Albums produced by Nick Mira
Albums produced by Scott Storch
Albums produced by Cardiak